Arthur Pappas (born in Sutherland, New South Wales) is an Australian former rugby league footballer who played for the Cronulla-Sutherland Sharks and South Sydney Rabbitohs clubs in the New South Wales Rugby League premiership competition.

References

Australian rugby league players
Cronulla-Sutherland Sharks players
South Sydney Rabbitohs players
Australian people of Greek descent
Living people
Rugby league second-rows
Year of birth missing (living people)
Rugby league players from Sydney